Elke Radlingmaier (born 15 September 1943) is an Austrian fencer. She competed in the women's individual and team foil events at the 1972 Summer Olympics.

References 

1943 births
Living people
Austrian female foil fencers
Olympic fencers of Austria
Fencers at the 1972 Summer Olympics